Kristin Harmel (born May 4, 1979) is an American novelist. Her most notable works include The Book of Lost Names, The Forest of Vanishing Stars, The Sweetness of Forgetting, and The Paris Daughter. 

Born in Newton, Massachusetts, Harmel gained her first writing experience at the age of 16 as a sports reporter for the St. Petersburg Times, and Tampa Bay AllSports magazine  while still attending Northeast High School in St. Petersburg, Florida.

A graduate of the University of Florida, Harmel was a reporter for PEOPLE magazine from 2000 to 2012 and a regular contributor to the nationally syndicated television morning show "The Daily Buzz. Her work has appeared in dozens of other publications, including Men's Health, Glamour, YM, Teen People, People en Español, Runner's World, American Baby, Every Day With Rachel Ray, and more.

Harmel resides in Orlando, Florida.

Her books have been translated into more than thirty languages and have been New York Times bestsellers, USA Today bestsellers and international bestsellers. Her The Book of Lost Names was a finalist for the National Jewish Book Award and for a Goodreads Choice Award in 2020.

Harmel is the co-founder and co-host of the web show Friends & Fiction.

Harmel has lived in Paris and Los Angeles and now resides in Orlando, Florida.

Books 
 2006: How to Sleep with a Movie Star
 2007: The Blonde Theory
 2007: The Art of French Kissing
 2008: When You Wish
 2009: Italian for Beginners
 2010: After
 2012: The Sweetness of Forgetting
 2014: The Life Intended
 2016: How to Save a Life: A Novella
 2016: When We Meet Again
2018: The Room on Rue Amelie
2019: The Winemaker's Wife
2020: The Book of Lost Names
 2021: The Forest of Vanishing Stars
2022: The Paris Daughter

References

External links

University of Florida alumni
Living people
Novelists from Florida
21st-century American novelists
American women novelists
American chick lit writers
1979 births
Writers from Newton, Massachusetts
American women journalists
21st-century American women writers
Novelists from Massachusetts
21st-century American non-fiction writers